Bold is a civil parish in the Metropolitan Borough of St Helens in Merseyside, England. Bold itself is situated to the south east of St Helens, near to the boundaries with Halton and Warrington in Cheshire. The parish extends southwards beyond the M62 motorway and includes the hamlet of Bold Heath along with the Clock Face and New Bold area of St Helens.  According to the 2001 Census it had a population of 3,410 at the 2011 Census

History
Bold is on the former site of the estate ( in 1848, almost 7000 acres) of Bold Hall, the home of the ancient family of Bolde, who settled there before the Norman Conquest and ran the estate for hundreds of years. When Peter Bold  MP died in 1762, leaving three daughters but no son, the estate passed out of the hands of the family and was eventually broken up. The Hall and the remaining 1500 acres were sold in 1893 to a syndicate of colliery proprietors.

The 150th anniversary event of the Liverpool and Manchester Railway and the Rainhill Trials was held on the extensive rail sidings at Bold in May 1980. The event featured a working replicas of Stephenson's Rocket and Sans Pareil, a tilting train and a selection of main line railway locomotives. Bold Colliery was the last coal mine in Britain to use steam locomotives, ending the practice in the autumn of 1982.

Economy
The Bold area was the site of Bold Colliery, with Bold A and B Power Stations on adjacent land. These power stations had a total electricity generating capacity of 300 megawatts (MW). At the time of completion, between 1958 and 1960, they were the largest such generating facility in the north west. The colliery and power stations are now closed, with the latter site redeveloped for housing and the creation of public open spaces.  Other industry in the area included a large engineering works which is now an industrial estate.

Bold A and B Power Stations were coal fired, with a direct coal conveyor belt link from a washery at the colliery. This fed either directly to coal bunkers in both stations or to a stocking area. The extensive rail sidings were utilised for coal delivery, either from Bold Colliery or from other collieries via the main Liverpool to Manchester Lines. The coal from Bold Colliery was deep mined and therefore costly to recover. In later years, due to commercial reasons, the main coal supply became mostly by road from either Yorkshire or Scotland.

The 'A' power station had an installed capacity of 120 MW. It consisted of four 30 MW two-cylinder turbines/alternators manufactured by Metropolitan-Vickers and Associated Electrical Industries (AEI). No.3 M/C was installed with the first direct water-cooled alternator. Steam was supplied from four Yarrow & Co. coal-fired boilers with tangentially fired tilting pulverized fuel burners, with 3no type LM13 table mills made by ICL of Derby.

The 'B' power station was installed with three 60 MW machines (equalling 180 MW total capacity). It used a central unit control system with the turbine/hydrogen cooled alternators manufactured by the General Electric Company (GEC). As with 'A' power station, no.3 alternator was a prototype direct water-cooled machine. The coolant water was fed via glass tubes on the three-phase connections. Each unit had boilers manufactured by John Thompson of Wolverhampton, each using two suction ball mills each with two exhausters, these feeding to twelve front wall pulverized fuel burners. The boilers fed steam at 900 psi/900 degrees Fahrenheit directly to each turbine/alternator.

Transport
Many bus services serve the Bold ward including Arriva North West's 32/32A/32C, 33/33A, 121 and 122, Merseytravel's 140, 265 and 141 services, Halton Transport's 17/17A/17B and Strawberry Bus' Line 1 service. However, there are no railway stations located in the ward, with the nearest being Lea Green railway station and St Helens Junction railway station located in the Sutton, Merseyside ward.

Facilities
The ward contains a number of facilities including a public house, a miners' club and a Labour club (all of which are located in Clock Face, Merseyside) and a series of mini supermarkets and off-licences. The nearest chain supermarkets are a Morrisons supermarket, Tesco Metro store and branches of The Co-operative Food which are located in bordering wards. There is also a Post Office Ltd branch located in the Clock Face, Merseyside area of the ward.

See also
 Listed buildings in Bold, St Helens

References

Notes

General
 John Thompson Engineering
 GEC

External links

St Helens, Merseyside
Towns and villages in the Metropolitan Borough of St Helens
Civil parishes in Merseyside